Dieter Karl Cäsar Wedel (12 November 1939 – 13 July 2022) was a German director. He is considered to be one of Germany's best-known television directors. He also served as the artistic director of the Nibelung Festival in Worms between 2003 and 2014.

In the Me Too campaign, Wedel was accused in January 2018 by several actresses of sexual harassment and in the case of actress Jany Tempel even rape. There have been official concerns about the alleged long-time coverup of Wedel's actions because most of his work was done through public broadcasting and received government money. After official investigations against him, Wedel resigned from his post as the artistic director of the Bad Hersfelder Festspiele.

Wedel was married to Ursula Wolters for many years, but in the past has also had relationships with other women, among them actresses Hannelore Elsner and Ingrid Steeger. He had six children.

Wedel died from leukemia on 13 July 2022 in Hamburg, at the age of 82.

Filmography 
Source:

(with producing television channel behind the title)
 1969: Willi, NDR
 1970: Gedenktag, NDR
 1971: Hamburg Transit: Grüner Türke, NDR/ARD
 1972:  (TV miniseries), NDR/ARD
 1972:  (TV series), ARD
 1973: Tatort: Ein ganz gewöhnlicher Mord, ARD
 1974: Eintausend Milliarden, NDR/ARD
 1974: Eiger, ARD
 1974: Aus Liebe zum Sport (TV series), ARD
 1975: Die Rakete, ARD
 1976:  (TV miniseries), ARD
 1977: Das Rentenspiel
 1981/1982: Bretter, die die Welt bedeuten (TV series), SR/ARD
 1982: Schwarz Rot Gold: Alles in Butter, NDR/ARD
 1982: Schwarz Rot Gold: Unser Land, NDR/ARD
 1984: Der Mann, der keine Autos mochte, ZDF
 1985: Schwarz Rot Gold: Nicht schießen!, NDR/ARD
 1987: Kampf der Tiger, ZDF
 1988:  (TV miniseries), WDR/ARD
 1993:  (TV miniseries), ZDF
 1994: Sylvia Brandt – Ich greife ein, Sat.1
 1996:  (TV miniseries), ZDF
 1998:  (TV miniseries), Sat.1
 2002: Die Affäre Semmeling (TV miniseries), ZDF
 2006: , ZDF
 2007: , ZDF
 2010: , ARD

References

External links

1939 births
2022 deaths
Mass media people from Frankfurt
German film directors
German male screenwriters
Year of birth uncertain
Free University of Berlin alumni
Officers Crosses of the Order of Merit of the Federal Republic of Germany
Deaths from leukemia